Caiophora is a genus of flowering plants belonging to the family Loasaceae.

Its native range is Western and Southern South America to Southern Brazil.

Species:

Caiophora aconquijae 
Caiophora andina 
Caiophora arechavaletae 
Caiophora boliviana 
Caiophora buraeavii 
Caiophora canarinoides 
Caiophora carduifolia 
Caiophora cernua 
Caiophora chuquisacana 
Caiophora chuquitensis 
Caiophora cirsiifolia 
Caiophora clavata 
Caiophora contorta 
Caiophora coronata 
Caiophora dederichiorum 
Caiophora deserticola 
Caiophora dumetorum 
Caiophora espigneira 
Caiophora hibiscifolia 
Caiophora lateritia 
Caiophora macrantha 
Caiophora madrequisa 
Caiophora mollis 
Caiophora nivalis 
Caiophora patagonica 
Caiophora pedicularifolia 
Caiophora peduncularis 
Caiophora pentlandii 
Caiophora pterosperma 
Caiophora pulchella 
Caiophora rosulata 
Caiophora rusbyana 
Caiophora scarlatina 
Caiophora sleumeri 
Caiophora spegazzinii 
Caiophora stenocarpa 
Caiophora tenuis 
Caiophora tomentosula 
Caiophora vargasii

References

Loasaceae
Cornales genera